Sambucus nigra is a species complex of flowering plants in the family Adoxaceae native to most of Europe. Common names include elder, elderberry, black elder, European elder,  European elderberry, European black elderberry and tramman (Isle of Man). It grows in a variety of conditions including both wet and dry fertile soils, primarily in sunny locations. The plant is widely grown as an ornamental shrub or small tree. Both the flowers and the berries have a long tradition of culinary use, primarily for cordial and wine.

Although elderberry is commonly used in dietary supplements and traditional medicine, there is no scientific evidence that it provides any benefit for maintaining health or treating diseases.

Description

The bark, light gray when young, changes to a coarse gray outer bark with lengthwise furrowing, lenticels prominent. The young stems are hollow.

The hermaphroditic flowers have five stamens, which are borne in large, flat corymbs 10–25 cm in diameter in late spring to mid-summer. The individual flowers are ivory white,  in diameter, with five petals, and are pollinated by flies.

The fruit is a glossy, dark purple to black berry 3–5 mm diameter, produced in drooping clusters in late autumn. The dark color of elderberry fruit occurs from its rich phenolic content, particularly from anthocyanins.

Taxonomy

Subspecies

There are several other closely related species, native to Asia and North America, which are similar, and sometimes treated as subspecies of Sambucus nigra, including S. nigra subsp. canadensis and S. nigra subsp. cerulea.

Etymology 
The Latin specific epithet nigra means "black", and refers to the deeply dark colour of the berries. The English term for the tree is not believed to come from the word "old", but from the Anglo Saxon æld, meaning fire, because the hollow stems of the branches were used as bellows to blow air into a fire.

Distribution and habitat

Sambucus nigra is native to Europe as far east as Turkey. It is native in, and common throughout, the British Isles. It has been introduced to parts of most other continents of the world.

Hedges, waste-ground roadsides, and woods are the typical habitats for the species.
S. nigra is recorded as very common in Ireland in hedges as scrub in woods.

Ecology 

Like other elderberries, Sambucus nigra is subject to elder whitewash fungus and jelly ear fungus. Strong-scented flowers in wild populations of S. nigra attract numerous, minute flower thrips which may contribute to the transfer of pollen between inflorescences.

Wildlife value 
Elder rates as fair to good forage for animals such as mule deer, elk, sheep, and small birds. The fruit are an important food for many fruit-eating birds, notably blackcaps. Ripe elderberries are a favorite food for migrating band-tailed pigeons in northern California, which may sometimes strip an entire bush in a short time. The species provides good habitat for large and small mammals, as well as nesting habitat for many birds, including hummingbirds, warblers, and vireos. It is also a larval host to the spring azure.

Except for the flowers and ripe berries (but including the ripe seeds), all parts of the plant are poisonous to mammals, containing the cyanogenic glycoside sambunigrin (C14H17NO6, CAS number 99-19-4). The bark contains calcium oxalate crystals.

Cultivation
It is a very common feature of hedgerows and scrubland in Britain and northern Europe.

Some selections and cultivars have variegated or coloured leaves and other distinctive qualities, and are grown as ornamental plants. S. nigra f. porphyrophylla has dark maroon or black leaves, and pale pink flowers.

The following cultivars have gained the Royal Horticultural Society's Award of Garden Merit:  
S. nigra f. laciniata (cut-leaved elder)
S. nigra f. porphyrophylla 'Eva'
S. nigra f. porphyrophylla 'Gerda'

Toxicity
Components of the elderberry plant, including its fruit, contain diverse phytochemicals, such as alkaloids, lectins, and cyanogenic glycosides, which may be toxic if consumed raw.  The seeds and all green parts of the plant contain cyanogenic glycosides. Consumption of berries, leaves, bark or stems, if not properly prepared, may cause nausea, vomiting, and severe diarrhea. Elderberry plant constituents or products should not be consumed during pregnancy or by people with allergies or gastrointestinal diseases. Elderberry products may cause adverse effects when used with prescription drugs.

Uses

The dark blue or purple berries are mildly poisonous in their raw state, but are edible after cooking. They can be used to make jam, jelly, chutney, and Pontack sauce. In Scandinavia and Germany, soup made from the elderberry (e.g. the German Fliederbeersuppe) is a traditional meal.

Commonly, the flowerheads are used in infusions, giving a drink in Northern Europe and the Balkans. These drinks are sold commercially as elderflower cordial or elderflower pressé . In Europe, the flowers are made into a syrup or cordial (in Romanian: Socată, in Swedish: fläder(blom)saft, in Danish: hyldeblomstsaft / hyldedrik), which is diluted with water before drinking. The popularity of this traditional drink recently has encouraged some commercial soft drink producers to introduce elderflower-flavoured drinks (Fanta Shokata, Freaky Fläder). The flowers also may be dipped into a light batter and then fried to make elderflower fritters.

The berries may be made into elderberry wine. In Hungary, an elderberry brandy is made that requires 50 kilograms of fruit to produce 1 litre of brandy. In south-western Sweden, it is traditional to make a snaps liqueur flavoured with elderflower. Elderflowers are used in liqueurs such as St-Germain, and in a mildly alcoholic sparkling elderflower 'champagne', although a more alcoholic home-made version can be made. In Beerse, Belgium, a variety of jenever called beers vlierke is made from the berries.

Traditional medicine 

This plant is used in traditional medicine by native peoples and herbalists. Extracts of the flowers and fruits are used for cold and flu symptoms, although there is no high-quality clinical evidence that it is effective for treating any disease.

References

Further reading
 
Rushforth, K. (1999). Trees of Britain and Europe. HarperCollins .

External links

nigra
Berries
Flora of Europe
Flora of North America
Flora of temperate Asia
Flora of the Eastern United States
Flora of the Western United States
Plants described in 1753
Taxa named by Carl Linnaeus
Medicinal plants
Garden plants of Asia
Garden plants of Europe
Garden plants of North America
Edible fruits
Flora of Algeria
Flora without expected TNC conservation status